Sun Valley is a 1996, Chinese film that was directed by He Ping. Along with his film, Swordsmen in Double Flag Town, Sun Valley is considered one of He Ping's "Chinese westerns." The film stars Zhang Fengyi as The Avenger, a mysterious hero who arrives at the eponymous valley to await his enemies.

Sun Valley was a Chinese-Hong Kong co-production between the China Film Co-Production Corporation, Xi'an Film Studio, Media Asia and Huanya Film Corporation. It was He's first film funded by outside sources. The film was entered into the 46th Berlin International Film Festival where it won an Honourable Mention.

Cast 
 Zhang Fengyi as The Avenger.
 Ku Feng as Old Man, an old warrior who has settled in the valley to become a devout Buddhist.
 Wang Xueqi as Black Bull
 Yuan Chen as Yellow Skin

Release
The film was released in 1996 by Media Asia Distribution and later in the United States by Miramax on Television. To date, it has not been released on DVD and Blu-ray. It has only been released in the VCD format.

References

External links 

Sun Valley at the Chinese Movie Database

1996 films
1990s Mandarin-language films
1996 drama films
Films directed by He Ping
Media Asia films
Chinese action films